Turn It Up is the third studio album from Australian singer-songwriter Shannon Noll. It was released on 15 September 2007 and peaked at number 3 in Australia.

Track listing
 "Loud" – 3:11
 "Everybody Needs a Little Help" – 3:34
 "In Pieces" – 3:33
 "Crashing Down" – 3:20
 "Is You" – 3:44
 "Walls" – 3:37
 "Breakdown" – 3:46
 "Way Out" – 3:14
 "Sorry Is Just Too Late" (co-written with Richie Sambora) – 3:55
 "Afterburn" – 4:26
 "Won't Let You Go" – 3:48
 "Only Thing Missing" – 4:31
 "Tomorrow" (iTunes exclusive) – 4:01

Limited edition DVD
 "Turn It Up – Making of the Album"
 "Loud" (music video)
 Los Angeles photo shoot
 "On the Set of the 'Loud' Video"

Charts and certifications

Weekly charts

Year-end charts

Certifications

Release history

References

2007 albums
Shannon Noll albums
Sony BMG albums